Nils Gustaf Lagerheim (1860–1926) was a Swedish botanist, mycologist, phycologist, and pteridologist.

Today, he is best remembered as one of the chief architects of pollen analysis as a tool in botany, alongside his student Ernst Post.

In 1895, botanists Giovanni Battista De Toni and Robert Hippolyte Chodat published Lagerheimia, which is a genus of green algae in the family Oocystaceae, named in his honour. Then in 1940, Boedijn published Lagerheimiella, another green algae genus.

References 

Swedish botanists
Swedish mycologists
Swedish phycologists
1860 births
1926 deaths